Sharon Tal Yguado is a senior media executive and was named three times one of the most influential media executives in Hollywood.

Yguado has built studio divisions at notable media companies including Amazon and Fox. She is known for her work on fantasy and science fiction projects including The Walking Dead, The Boys, The Lord of the Rings: The Rings of Power, The Wheel of Time, and Invincible. In her role as head of scripted programming at amazon she also oversaw shows like The Marvelous Mrs. Maisel, Fleabag, Homecoming, Jack Ryan, Good Omens, and other original shows. Yguado also served as the head of Fox International Studios and Global Programming at Fox Networks Group.

Biography 
Yguado was born in Israel.

In 2004, Yguado moved to Italy and started her career as VP of Programming at Fox International Channels, where she was responsible for the global programming strategy.

In 2008, Yguado moved back to the US, and in 2010, was promoted to an SVP role.

In 2011, Yguado partnered with AMC on The Walking Dead. Yguado did the deal with AMC at a script stage and bought the international rights for the show outside of the United States and Canada.

In 2012, Yguado was promoted to an EVP role.

In 2015, Yguado started a new studio division for Fox called Fox International Studios. In this new role, Yguado produced and co-produced original global content for Fox's international channels, partnering with Robert Kirkman to produce his next TV show Outcast. The show ran for two seasons on Cinemax in the US and all Fox's cable channels outside the US.

In 2017, Yguado was hired by Amazon Studios in a senior leadership position to start a new entertainment division, focusing on large franchises in the worlds of fantasy and sci-fi. In this role, Yguado identified, developed, and produced numerous shows. The first show she picked up was The Boys. The show was launched in late 2019 and became a success story for Amazon, and it is currently shooting its third season and has had multiple spinoffs announced.

In October 2017, Yguado was promoted to take over all scripted programming at Amazon Studios, including responsibility for all Amazon studios drama and comedy shows, such as The Marvelous Mrs. Maisel, Fleabag, Homecoming, Jack Ryan, and Good Omens.

One of Yguado's notable projects and credits was The Lord of the Rings: The Rings of Power project, which she spearheaded for Amazon. She led the partnership and pitched the show to the Tolkien Estate, Warner Bros., and HarperCollins, ultimately winning the rights in a bidding war with Netflix, HBO, and Apple. In 2017, Yguado announced the pick-up of the series. She acted as the point creative executive on the project and was responsible for selecting and approving the writers and producers on the show.

In 2018, Yguado developed the show The Wheel of Time. Yguado also brought Jonah Nolan and Lisa Joy to Amazon to make the show The Peripheral.

In May 2019, Yguado left Amazon, but retained her role as an executive producer for Rings. Yguado pushed against the news about The Lord of the Rings show's budget. The show premiered in September 2022 and was reportedly watched by more than 25 million viewers worldwide. Yguado was responsible for bringing Sharon Horgan, Robert Kirkman, and Skybound.

Yguado is currently serving as the founder and CEO of Astrid Entertainment and is investor and advisor at Husslup and  Hinterland. She is also a board member at RACAT, Echo Horizon School, and Hernan Lopez Family Foundation.

See also
Astrid Entertainment

References

External links

Year of birth missing (living people)
Living people
Israeli business executives
Israeli mass media people
Israeli expatriates in the United States
Israeli expatriates in Italy
21st-century Israeli businesswomen
21st-century Israeli businesspeople
Disney executives